Oghma was a literary journal in the Irish language. It was published from 1989 to 1998, and replaced by the journal An Aimsir Óg.  It included the works of Sean Mac Mathuna, Micheál Ó Conghaile and others.

References

1989 establishments in Ireland
1998 disestablishments in Ireland
Defunct literary magazines published in Europe
Defunct magazines published in Ireland
Literary magazines published in Ireland
Magazines established in 1989
Magazines disestablished in 1998